Weerde is a railway station in the town of Weerde, Flemish Brabant, Belgium. The station opened on 1 January 1864 on the Lines 25 and 27. The train services are operated by National Railway Company of Belgium (NMBS).

Train services
The station is served by the following services:

Brussels RER services (S1) Antwerp – Mechelen – Brussels – Waterloo – Nivelles (weekdays)
Brussels RER services (S1) Antwerp – Mechelen – Brussels (weekends)
Brussels RER services (S5) Mechelen – Brussels-Luxembourg – Etterbeek – Halle – Enghien (- Geraardsbergen)

See also
 List of railway stations in Belgium

References

External links
 
 Weerde railway station at Belgian Railways website

Railway stations in Belgium
Railway stations opened in 1864
Railway stations in Flemish Brabant